Sextius Alexandre François de Miollis (Aix, September 18, 1759 – Aix, June 18, 1828) was a French military officer serving in the American Revolutionary War, the French Revolutionary Wars, and the Napoleonic Wars.

Biography
His father was a councilor of the provincial Parlement of Aix who was ennobled in 1770 for his services at the legal courts there.

He entered service at age 17 in the infantry regiment of the Soissonnais. In the last campaigns of the American Revolution, he served as sub-lieutenant under General Rochambeau. His face was disfigured in battle at the siege of Yorktown and he returned to France as a captain.

He headed the First National Battalion of volunteers of Bouches-du-Rhône. In the French Revolutionary Wars, he demonstrated skill and bravery often, becoming a brigadier general in 1796.

Under Napoleon, he was deployed to Italy, taking part in the siege of Mantua. Commanding a division after the Treaty of Campo Formio, he was put in charge of the occupation of Tuscany.

Under General André Masséna, he took part in the 1799 defense of Genoa. He became the governor of Belle-Île-en-Mer in 1803, then of Mantua in 1806. At Mantua, he honored Virgil with a monument. With some pomp and circumstance, he transferred the ashes of Ariosto to the University of Ferrara where they received the homage due to them. At Verona, he restored the Arena, one of the most interesting of Roman antiquities.

In 1807, he commanded in Tuscany, occupying Rome with a division. He carried out his orders there with respect to Pope Pius VII and the queen of Etruria, Maria Luisa de Bourbon of Spain. He governed the Papal States until Napoleon's abdication in 1814.

Louis XVIII conferred upon him the departments of Bouches-du-Rhône and Vaucluse. Napoleon recalled him to duty during the Hundred Days to serve at Metz, where he remained until mid-October 1815, after which he retired permanently from active duty.

His brother attained a doctorate in law in 1781, became a lawyer, and then prefect of Finistère from 1805 to 1815. Another brother held the bishopric of Digne from 1805 to 1838, probably a nepotistic Napoleonic appointment.

His name is engraved on the south side of the Arc de Triomphe.

References

French generals
French military personnel of the American Revolutionary War
Military leaders of the French Revolutionary Wars
French military personnel of the French Revolutionary Wars
French military personnel of the Napoleonic Wars
1759 births
1828 deaths
Names inscribed under the Arc de Triomphe